The Raid: Redemption is a soundtrack/score album composed by Joseph Trapanese and Linkin Park's co-vocalist Mike Shinoda, who also serves as producer for the album, which was originally inspired from the 2012 live-action film The Raid: Redemption.

The album contains two songs performer by other artists, "Razors Out" by Chino Moreno and "Suicide Music" by Get Busy Committee.

Background
While the film was still in production, in May 2011, Sony Pictures Worldwide Acquisitions acquired the distribution rights of the film for the U.S. and tasked Mike Shinoda of Linkin Park and Joseph Trapanese to create a new score for U.S. market. The film premiered at the 2011 Toronto International Film Festival with the original score from the Indonesian version which was composed by Aria Prayogi and Fajar Yuskemal, who also composed Evans's previous film, Merantau. The Raid made its debut in the U.S. with Trapanese and Shinoda's version at Sundance 2012.

On his blog, Shinoda stated that his score was over 50 minutes and almost all instrumental. After film production, he had room for two more songs, but did not want to sing or rap, so he posted pictures of two music artists. Deftones/††† frontman Chino Moreno guest performed "Razors Out". Rap group Get Busy Committee performed "Suicide Music".

Track listing

References

External links
 
 
 
 
 
 

Linkin Park
2012 soundtrack albums
Madison Gate Records soundtracks
Action film soundtracks